Cataloging & Classification Quarterly is a peer-reviewed, scholarly journal that publishes articles about library cataloging, classification, metadata, indexing, information retrieval, information management, and other topics related to library cataloging. Cataloging & Classification Quarterly is notable for being the only academic journal devoted to library cataloging. Despite its name, the journal is now published eight times a year, but occasionally some issues are combined. Thematic issues are interspersed with general issues.

History 
Cataloging & Classification Quarterly (CCQ) began publishing in 1980. Previous editors have been C. Donald Cook (founding editor; volumes 1-2, 1980-1982), George E. Gibbs (volumes 3-5, 1983-1985), and Ruth C. Carter (volumes 6-41, 1985-2006). The editor-in-chief since volume 42 has been Sandra K. Roe. The journal was published by Haworth Press until 2007 when the company was acquired by Taylor and Francis, the current publisher.

References

External links 
 

Library science journals
Information science journals
English-language journals
Publications established in 1980